Aquilia or Aquillia may refer to:

Aquilia Severa, wife of the ancient Roman emperor Elagabalus
Lex Aquilia, ancient Roman law which provided compensation to the owners of property injured by someone's fault
 Aquillia gens, a family in ancient Rome

See also
 Aquila (disambiguation)
 Aquileia, an ancient Roman city in Italy, at the head of the Adriatic